Drugnia  is a village in the administrative district of Gmina Pierzchnica, within Kielce County, Świętokrzyskie Voivodeship, in south-central Poland.

The village has a population of 310.

References

Drugnia
Kielce Governorate
Kielce Voivodeship (1919–1939)